Yagura may refer to:

 Yagura castle
 Yagura opening
 Yagura (tombs)
 Yagura (tower)

People with the surname
, Japanese singer and idol
 Norihiro Yagura

See also 
 Yugara (disambiguation)

Japanese-language surnames